The Scottish representatives to the first Parliament of Great Britain, serving from 1 May 1707 to 26 May 1708, were not elected like their colleagues from England and Wales, but rather hand-picked.

The forty five men sent to London in 1707, to the House of Commons of the 1st Parliament of Great Britain, were co-opted from the Commissioners of the newly adjourned Parliament of Scotland (see List of Constituencies in the Parliament of Scotland at the time of the Union).

Legal background to the composition of the 1st Parliament
Under the Treaty of Union of the Two Kingdoms of England and Scotland it was provided:

"III. THAT the United Kingdom of Great Britain be Represented by one and the same Parliament to be stiled the Parliament of Great Britain.

...

XXII. THAT ... A Writ do issue ... Directed to the Privy Council of Scotland, Commanding them to Cause ... forty five Members to be elected to sit in the House of Commons of the Parliament of Great Britain ... in such manner as by a subsequent Act of the present session of the Parliament of Scotland shall be settled ... And that ... the members of the House of Commons of the said Parliament of England and the forty five Members for Scotland ... shall be ... the first Parliament of Great Britain ..."

The Parliament of Scotland duly passed an Act settling the manner of electing the sixteen peers and forty five commoners to represent Scotland in the initial Parliament of Great Britain. A special provision for the 1st Parliament of Great Britain was "that the Sixteen Peers and Forty five Commissioners for Shires and Burghs shall be chosen by the Peers, Barrons and Burghs respectively in this present session of Parliament and out of the members thereof in the same manner that Committees of Parliament are usually now chosen shall be the members of the respective Houses of the said first Parliament of Great Britain for and on the part of Scotland ..."

The Kingdom of Great Britain came into existence on 1 May 1707.

Dates of the Parliament
Election: The members of the last House of Commons of England had been elected between 7 May 1705 and 6 June 1705. The last general election in pre-Union Scotland was in 1703.

First meeting and maximum legal term: Parliament first met on 23 October 1707. The Parliament was due to expire, if not sooner dissolved, at the end of the term of three years from the first meeting of the last Parliament of England, which would have been on 14 June 1708.

Dissolution: The 1st Parliament of Great Britain was dissolved on 3 April 1708.

Selection of Members from Scotland
Scotland was entitled to 45 Members in the new House of Commons.  The Scottish legislation prescribed the constituencies from which the Members of the Commons from Scotland were in future to be elected. These constituencies were first used in the election of 1708 to the 2nd Parliament. 

Of the 45 Members returned to the Parliament of Great Britain, 30 were Shire Commissioners and 15 were Burgh Commissioners.

Members of Parliament returned for Scotland (1707–1708)

References
 Scotland in The History of Parliament 1690-1715, 2002. (this list does not include the Erskines uncle and nephew)
 Leigh Rayment, . Accessed 13 November 2011.

See also 

 Lists of MPs for constituencies in Scotland

Politics of Scotland
1707 in Scotland
18th century in Scotland
 
Parliament of GB